Igor Boraska  (born September 26, 1970 in Split) is a Croatian rower who won a bronze medal in the eights competition at the 2000 Summer Olympics in Sydney.

Early life 
Igor Boraska was born on September 26, 1970 in Split, SR Croatia, Yugoslavia.

Boraska attended Brown University, where he rowed for the school's team. Boraska graduated in 1994 with a degree in mechanical engineering and economics.

Rowing career 
His teammates at Sydney were Branimir Vujević, Nikša Skelin, Siniša Skelin, Krešimir Čuljak, Tomislav Smoljanović, Tihomir Franković, Igor Francetić and Silvijo Petriško (coxswain). Boraska also participated at the 1996 Summer Olympics and at the  2004 Summer Olympics, both time in coxless four discipline. He was a World champion and a medalist at the World Rowing Championships.

He was a world record (world's best time) holder, for 20 years, in a coxed pair event set at 1994 World rowing championship.

Boraska retired from competitive rowing in 2010.

Bobsleigh career 
Boraska was a member of a Croatian team at the 2002 Winter Olympics, as a part of a four-men bobsleigh team. He is the first Croat who participated in both the Summer and the Winter Olympic Games.

References

External links
databaseOlympic.com

1970 births
Living people
Croatian male rowers
Rowers at the 1996 Summer Olympics
Rowers at the 2000 Summer Olympics
Rowers at the 2004 Summer Olympics
Bobsledders at the 2002 Winter Olympics
Olympic rowers of Croatia
Olympic bronze medalists for Croatia
Olympic medalists in rowing
Medalists at the 2000 Summer Olympics
Croatian male bobsledders
Olympic bobsledders of Croatia
Rowers from Split, Croatia

Brown University School of Engineering alumni